List of 2017 UCI cycling teams in Spain:

UCI ProTeams
: Website

Professional Continental Teams
Caja Rural - Seguros RGA: Website
Burgos BH: Website

Continental Teams
Euskadi Baque Country - Murias: Website

References

Spain
Cycling teams